SMS Kaiser has been the name of two ships of the German Imperial Navy:

 , a 
 , a fleet auxiliary converted into a minelayer during World War I

Additionally, a number of Imperial Navy vessels were given names of specific kaisers:

 , an 11,600-ton , launched 1900
 , an 11,600-ton Kaiser Friedrich III-class battleship, launched 1896
 , an 11,600-ton Kaiser Friedrich III-class battleship, launched 1899
 , an 11,600-ton Kaiser Friedrich III-class battleship, launched 1897
 , an 11,600-ton Kaiser Friedrich III-class battleship, launched 1899

Two ships have been named Kaiserin:

 , a 25,000-ton Kaiser-class battleship, launched 1911
 :  6,000-ton unique heavy cruiser, launched 1892

SMS Kaiser was the name of a ship of the Austro-Hungarian Navy:
 , the last wooden ship of the line of the Austro-Hungarian Navy.

German Navy ship names